Aquaspirillum fasciculus is a gram-negative freshwater rod in the genus Aquaspirillum.

Description
The species lives in freshwater and propels itself through flagella.

References

Neisseriales
Bacteria described in 1976